This is a list of diseases starting with the letter "W".

W
 W syndrome

Wa

Waa–Wan
 Waaler–Aarskog syndrome
 Waardenburg anophthalmia syndrome
 Waardenburg syndrome
 Waardenburg syndrome type 1
 Waardenburg syndrome type 2
 Waardenburg syndrome type 2A
 Waardenburg syndrome type 2B
 Waardenburg syndrome type 3
 Waardenburg syndrome, type 4
 Waardenburg type Pierpont
 Wagner's disease
 Wagner–Stickler syndrome
 WAGR syndrome
 Walbaum–Titran–Durieux–Crepin syndrome
 Waldenström's macroglobulinemia
 Waldmann disease
 Walker–Dyson syndrome
 Wallerian degeneration
 Wallis–Zieff–Goldblatt syndrome
 Wandering spleen

War–Wat
 Warburg–Sjo–Fledelius syndrome; see Micro syndrome
 Warburg–Thomsen syndrome
 Warburton–Anyane–Yeboa syndrome
 Warfarin antenatal infection
 Warfarin necrosis
 Warkany syndrome
 Warman–Mulliken–Hayward syndrome
 Warm-reacting-antibody hemolytic anemia
 Warts
 Waterhouse–Friderichsen syndrome
 Watermelon stomach
 Watson syndrome

We

Wea–Wer
 Weaver–Johnson syndrome
 Weaver-like syndrome
 Weaver syndrome
 Weaver–Williams syndrome
 Weber–Parkes syndrome
 Weber–Sturge–Dimitri syndrome
 Weber–Christian disease
 Webster–Deming syndrome
 Wegener's granulomatosis (now known as granulomatosis with polyangiitis)
 Wegmann–Jones–Smith syndrome
 Weil syndrome
 Weinstein–Kliman–Scully syndrome
 Weismann–Netter–Stuhl syndrome
 Weissenbacher–Zweymuller syndrome
 Welander distal myopathy, Swedish type
 Weleber–Hecht–Bigley syndrome
 Wellesley–Carmen–French syndrome
 Wells–Jankovic syndrome
 Wells syndrome
 Werdnig–Hoffmann disease
 Werner's syndrome
 Wernicke–Korsakoff syndrome
 Wernicke's encephalopathy

Wes
 West Nile virus
 West syndrome
 Westerhof–Beemer–Cormane syndrome
 Western equine encephalitis
 Westphall disease

Wh
 Wheat hypersensitivity
 Whipple disease
 Whitaker syndrome
 White matter hypoplasia corpus callosum agenesia mental retardation
 White sponge nevus
 Whooping cough (Pertussis)
 Whyte–Murphy syndrome

Wi

Wie–Win
 Wieacker syndrome
 Wiedemann–Grosse–Dibbern syndrome
 Wiedemann–Oldigs–Oppermann syndrome
 Wiedemann–Opitz syndrome
 Wiedemann–Rautenstrauch syndrome
 Wildervanck syndrome
 Wilkes–Stevenson syndrome
 Wilkie–Taylor–Scambler syndrome
 Willebrand disease, acquired
 Willebrand disease
 Willems–De vries syndrome
 Williams syndrome
 Wilms' tumor
 Wilms tumor and pseudohermaphroditism
 Wilms tumor radial bilateral aplasia
 Wilms tumor-aniridia syndrome
 Wilson's disease
 Wilson–Turner syndrome
 Winchester syndrome
 Winkelman–Bethge–Pfeiffer syndrome
 Winship–Viljoen–Leary syndrome
 Winter–Harding–Hyde syndrome
 Winter–Shortland–Temple syndrome

Wis–Wit
 Wisconsin syndrome
 Wiskott–Aldrich syndrome
 Witkop syndrome

Wo–Wy
 Wohlwill–Andrade syndrome
 Wolcott–Rallison syndrome
 Wolff–Parkinson–White syndrome
 Wolf–Hirschhorn syndrome
 Wolfram syndrome
 Wolman disease
 Woodhouse–Sakati syndrome
 Woods–Black–Norbury syndrome
 Woods–Leversha–Rogers syndrome
 Wooly hair syndrome
 Woolly hair autosomal recessive
 Woolly hair hypotrichosis everted lower lip outstanding ears
 Woolly hair palmoplantar keratoderma cardiac anomalies
 Woolly hair, congenital
 Worster-Drought syndrome, various syndromes identified by Dr. Worster-Drought
 Worster-Drought syndrome associated with cerebral palsy
 Worster-Drought syndrome, also known as familial British dementia
 Worth syndrome
 Wright–Dick syndrome
 Wrinkly skin syndrome
 Writer's cramp
 Wt limb blood syndrome
 Wyburn–Mason's syndrome

W